Francesca Curmi (born 7 July 2002) is a Maltese tennis player.
 
Curmi has represented Malta at the Fed Cup, where she has a win–loss record of 6–1.

On the junior tour, Curmi has a career-high combined ranking of 64, achieved on 28 May 2018.

Curmi participated in 2018 Summer Youth Olympics in singles, doubles and mixed doubles. In doubles partnering with Eléonora Molinaro from Luxembourg. The Maltese-Luxembourgian pair lost in 3 sets to French duet Clara Burel and Diane Parry 4–6, 6–3, 5–10 in the first round.

Curmi represented Malta at the 2022 Mediterranean Games held in Oran, Algeria. Curmi and Elaine Genovese won the silver medal in the women's doubles event. She was also one of the flag bearers for Malta during the opening ceremony.

Junior career
Junior Grand Slam results - Singles:

 Australian Open: 1R (2019)

 French Open: 1R (2018)

 Wimbledon: Q1 (2018)

 US Open: 1R (2018)

Junior Grand Slam results - Doubles:

 Australian Open: SF (2019)

 French Open: 1R (2018)

 Wimbledon: 2R (2018)

 US Open: 1R (2019)

ITF Circuit finals

Singles: 4 (2 titles, 2 runner–ups)

Doubles: 3 (1 title, 2 runner–ups)

Notes

References

External links
 
 
 

2002 births
Living people
Maltese female tennis players
Tennis players at the 2018 Summer Youth Olympics
Competitors at the 2022 Mediterranean Games
Mediterranean Games silver medalists for Malta
Mediterranean Games medalists in tennis
21st-century Maltese women